Cafasso is a surname. Notable people with the surname include:

Fernando Cafasso (born 1983), Argentine footballer
Joseph Cafasso (1811–1860), Italian Roman Catholic priest
Joseph A. Cafasso (born 1956), American consultant